Molco Airport ,  is an airport serving Choshuenco, a small lakeside town in the Los Ríos Region of Chile.

The airport is near the mouth of the Fuy River at the eastern end of Panguipulli Lake. West approach and departures are over the water. There is mountainous terrain in all quadrants.

See also

Transport in Chile
List of airports in Chile

References

External links
OpenStreetMap - Molco
OurAirports - Molco
FallingRain - Molco Airport

Airports in Chile
Airports in Los Ríos Region